Melica tibetica, is a grass species in the family Poaceae that is endemic to China and can be found in such provinces as Inner Mongolia, Qinghai, Sichuan, and Tibetan Autonomous Region.

Description 
The internodes are scaberulous. The leaf-sheaths are tubular and scabrous, closed for part of their length. The  ligule is a papery membrane which lacks hairs. The leaf-blade tip is acuminate. It axis are scabrous with smooth branches.

Fertile spikelets are pediceled, the pedicels of which are filiform and puberulous. The florets are diminished at the apex.

Glumes are very different. Palea have ciliolated keels and is 2-veined. The species' fruits are caryopses,  in length, and have an additional pericarp with linear hilum.

Ecology 
It blooms from July to September.

References 

tibetica
Grasses of China
Endemic flora of China
Flora of Inner Mongolia
Flora of Qinghai
Flora of Sichuan
Flora of Tibet